Talabat (Arabic: , Ṭalabāt) is an online food ordering company founded in Kuwait in 2004. As of April 2021, Talabat operates in Kuwait, Saudi Arabia, Bahrain, the United Arab Emirates, Oman, Qatar, Jordan, Egypt, and Iraq. A subsidiary of Delivery Hero since 2016, Talabat became the largest online food ordering company in the Middle East.

History 

In 2004, Talabat General Trading and Contracting Company was founded by Abdulaziz Al Loughani  and Khaled Al Otaibi in Kuwait. The name "Talabat" derives from the Arabic language and it means "orders" or "requests".

As Talabat’s popularity grew locally, it won the "Best E-Business Award" repeatedly in 2008 and 2009 with special recognition from the Emir of Kuwait, Sheikh Sabah Al-Ahmad Al-Jaber Al-Sabah.

In 2010, the business was operating out of Kuwait and Saudi Arabia with an average of 1,250 daily transactions. Talabat then underwent key changes such as the re-branding from 6alabat.com to Talabat.com, a shift from a hybrid form of Arabic and English spelling to a pure English spelling.

In 2011, a revamp of the platform took place with a new website layout and improvement in user interface.  

In 2012, Talabat expanded to Bahrain, United Arab Emirates, and Oman. On 19 January 2012, Talabat released its mobile application for Android devices. An app for iOS devices was also released. 

In 2013, it continued its expansion to Qatar.

In 2015, Talabat was acquired by the global German e-commerce group Rocket Internet for US$170 million. It became part of Rocket Internet's business unit Global Online Takeaway Group. 

In 2016, Rocket Internet's food delivery business, including Talabat, was taken over by online food marketplace Delivery Hero. In line with this acquisition, Abdulhamid Alomar took over as the CEO of the company.

In 2017, Talabat expanded its operations to Jordan.

In 2019, former Grab executive Tomaso Rodriguez was appointed as CEO, after the stepping down of Abdulhamid Alomar. 

Lawsuits were filed against the company after they were found violating fair competition rules in Kuwait. A settlement plea made by Talabat was also turned down.

In January 2020, food delivery company Carriage, also owned by Delivery Hero, was absorbed by Talabat.

In August 2020, it has been confirmed the Egyptian food delivery service Otlob, which was in operation since 1999 and became a Delivery Hero subsidiary in 2016, is getting rebranded as Talabat. As of September 2020, Talabat operates in Egypt.

In October 2020, Talabat announced they will expand into Iraq in early 2021, initially operating in Erbil before gradually expanding into more cities in the rest of the country. Talabat Iraq's online operation is separate from other countries, however. For example, cash-on-delivery is currently the only accepted method of payment in Iraq.

In December 2020, Talabat and Huawei signed a partnership to list Talabat App in the Huawei marketplace.

In August 2021, Talabat was selected as the official food delivery provider for Expo 2020, and their pavilion would display technological innovations for food delivery, such the cloud kitchen concept, whilst representing multiple food brands. In September 2021, Talabat partnered with Terminus Group, who is also an official premier partner for Expo 2020, to launch ten autonomous, last mile food-delivery robots for Expo visitors. Expo 2020 itself launched on 1 October 2021 following a year-long delay due

References 

Companies of Kuwait
Online food ordering
2015 mergers and acquisitions
2004 establishments in Kuwait